Grevillea hystrix, also known as porcupine grevillea, is a species of plant in the protea family that is endemic to Western Australia.

History and etymology
The species was first collected in 2013 by William Muir, recognised as a new taxon at the Western Australian Herbarium in 2014, and formally described by Robert Davis in 2020. The specific epithet hystrix is Latin for “porcupine”, with reference to the spiny leaves.

Description
The species grows as a low, prickly shrub to 40–60 cm in height by 30–100 cm across. The sharply pointed leaves are 5–8 mm long by 0.8–1 mm wide. The conflorescent flowers are predominantly red, appearing from late August to early October.

Distribution and habitat
The species is known only from a single population of about 20 plants, east of the mining town of Koolyanobbing, in the Coolgardie bioregion of Southwest Australia. It occurs in sandplain country in low open shrubland on yellow clayey-sandy soils.

References

hystrix
Proteales of Australia
Endemic flora of Australia
Flora of Western Australia
Plants described in 2020